Burrus is a genus of shield bugs in the tribe Podopini.

References

Shield bugs
Pentatomidae genera